Li Fen (born 25 August 1976) is a Chinese-born Swedish table tennis player. At the 2013 Table Tennis European Championships she made her first appearance in an international championship and won gold in the women's singles event.

References

External links
 

1976 births
Swedish female table tennis players
Living people
Table tennis players from Shandong
Chinese emigrants to Sweden
Chinese female table tennis players
Table tennis players at the 2016 Summer Olympics
Olympic table tennis players of Sweden
Naturalised table tennis players